Franklin Delano Roosevelt High School is  a coeducational public high school located at 5800 20th Avenue in the Mapleton section of Brooklyn, New York. It is a zoned/public high school, with an enrollment of approximately 3,700 students, encompassing grades 9–12. In total, the school includes 280,717 sq feet of class space, gyms, cafeteria, and auditorium.

Programs
The school offers Art, Business, Computers, Music, Social Sciences and Physical Education.  Their foreign language programs include Chinese and Spanish. The school offers 18 AP classes.

The school also provides Instructional Support Services for students such as Collaborative Team Teaching (CTT) classes, SETSS classes, and Bilingual classrooms. FDR High School also has a rigorous honors program, for example, Honors Algebra 1, Honors Chemistry, Honors Geometry, Honors Sophomore English, Honors Physics, Honors Algebra 2/Trigonometry, Honors Participation in Government, Honors Economics, and a special class called "Pre-Calculus for Juniors only" a class offered to students who have taken Algebra 1 in eighth grade.

FDR is also home to an alternative program called the Young Adult Borough Center (YABC) that provides over-aged and under-credited high school students with alternative means to obtain their high school diploma. Classes are offered in the evenings Monday through Thursday and students in good academic standing are provided a paid internship during the day.

Extracurricular activities

Sports
The Roosevelt High School offers a number of athletic activities for its students. For boys, they offer baseball, varsity and junior varsity basketball, bowling, football, handball, outdoor track, cricket, table tennis, soccer, tennis, volleyball, and wrestling, while girls have available basketball, bowling, handball, soccer, softball, tennis, and volleyball. The Girls Tennis Team won the 2011 PSAL Championship. The Cricket Team won the 2010 and 2011 PSAL Championship. The school has recently launched a dance team. Roosevelt has weight training and cardio facilities with gym and exercise equipment. Roosevelt received a grant for a few million dollars and built a field for sports and other events. In the spring of 2014, coach Yellen founded the FDR Badminton team. Throughout the year, the badminton team won 10–0 in the city tournaments, and in addition, won 2–0 in the state finals. FDR High School's badminton team was the first-ever recipient of the PSAL Badminton cup.

Notable alumni
 Eric Johnson (born 1966), former professional basketball player who had a brief career in the NBA for the Utah Jazz.
 Vinnie Johnson (born 1956), professional basketball player (1979–92).
 Dennis Raphael, Professor of Health Policy and Management at York University in Toronto{https://en.wikipedia.org/wiki/Dennis_Raphael}
 Alexander Vindman (born 1975), U.S. Army lieutenant colonel and Director for European Affairs for the United States National Security Council who testified in November 2019 before the United States Congress regarding the Trump–Ukraine scandal.

See also
 List of high schools in New York City
 New York City Department of Education

References

External links
 School Info.
 School Home Page.
 Multiple Pathways to Graduation Website (NYCDOE)

Public high schools in Brooklyn
Educational institutions established in 1965
1965 establishments in New York City
Monuments and memorials to Franklin D. Roosevelt in the United States